The Athletic Federation of North Macedonia (Macedonian Atletska Federacija na Severna Makedonija) is the governing body for the sport of athletics in North Macedonia.

Affiliations 
World Athletics
European Athletic Association (EAA)
Olympic Committee of North Macedonia (MOC)

National records 
AFM maintains the Macedonian records in athletics.

External links 
 AFNM official website
 

North Macedonia
Athletics
North Macedonia
Athletics in North Macedonia